Syed Maqsood Hussain (born September 29, 1981) is a Pakistani-born cricketer who played for the Oman national cricket team in List A cricket.

References 

Living people
Omani cricketers
People from Sialkot
Pakistani emigrants to Oman
Pakistani expatriates in Oman
1981 births